2-Amino-5-formylamino-6-(5-phospho--ribosylamino)pyrimidin-4(3H)-one is a metabolite in the riboflavin biosynthesis pathway. It is formed from GTP by the enzyme GTP cyclohydrolase IIa which catalyzes the hydrolysis of the 8,9 bond in the guanine group and loss of the beta and gamma phosphate groups. The molecule is deformylated by 2-amino-5-formylamino-6-ribosylaminopyrimidin-4(3H)-one 5'-monophosphate deformylase as the second step in the archaeal riboflavin biosynthetic pathway.

References

Pyrimidines